The sarcomonads or class Sarcomonadea are a group of amoeboid biciliate protists in the phylum Cercozoa. They are characterized by a propensity to move through gliding on their posterior cilium or through filopodia, a lack of scales or external theca, a soft cell surface without obvious cortical filamentous or membranous skeleton, two cilia without scales or hairs, tubular mitochondrial cristae, near-spherical extrusomes, and a microbody (probably a peroxisome) attached to the nucleus.

History
In 1993 Cavalier-Smith described the sarcomonads as a subclass known as “Sarcomonadia”, an assemblage of unrelated cercozoans (thaumatomonads, proteomyxids, cercomonads...) and excavates (jakobids), in the now defunct class “Heteromitea”, in the old phylum “Opalozoa”. This subclass was created to lump together protozoa that have an anisokont type of zoospore (i.e. two cilia of different lengths), are non-thecate and have isodiametric extrusomes. Sarcomonadia was composed of three superorders:
“Jakobidea” (orders Jakobida and Cercomonadida), made up of sarcomonads with a single Golgi dictyosome;
“Thaumatomonadidea” (order Thaumatomonadida), with scales made in vesicles associated with the mitochondria;
Proteomyxidea (orders Pseudosporida and Leucodictyida), made up of sarcomonads with an unusual intranuclear rod of microfilaments unseen in other protists.

Phylogenetic analyses published in 1997 showed close relationships between filose and reticulose amoebae and zooflagellates such as the sarcomonads, and they were grouped under the provisional phylum Rhizopoda. In here, the sarcomonads were grouped as the class Sarcomonadea inside the subphylum Monadofilosa, and Sarcomonadea was emended to exclude the proteomyxids and jakobids.

Later, in Cavalier-Smith's A revised six-kingdom system of life of 1998, the phylum Cercozoa was created to formally establish this group of protists previously known as Rhizopoda. This discovery put an end to the taxonomical dichotomy between amoebae and flagellates, since they are phylogenetically intermingled in Cercozoa.

In 2003 the term Sarcomonadea was emended again to contain only two orders:
Metopiida, comprising the single species Metopion fluens, but was later moved into a different class;
Cercomonadida, the first current sarcomonad order, comprising the families Cercomonadidae and Heteromitidae.

In 2009 the problematic Heteromitidae were broken apart and rearranged into the second current sarcomonad order Glissomonadida.

In 2012 the paracercomonads joined Sarcomonadea, initially as cercomonads and later as the third current sarcomonad order Paracercomonadida. At the same time, the superclass Ventrifilosa was created to comprise Sarcomonadea, Imbricatea and Thecofilosea. That same year, the protist Katabia was added to Sarcomonadea but remained incertae sedis within the group.

Classification
The class Sarcomonadea is most closely related to Imbricatea and Thecofilosea. Together, they form the superclass Ventrifilosa in the phylum Cercozoa. The current classification divides the class into three orders: paracercomonads (subclass Paracercomonada), cercomonads and glissomonads (subclass Pediglissa).

Class Sarcomonadea 
 Subclass Paracercomonada 
  Order Paracercomonadida 
   Family Paracercomonadidae 
 Subclass Pediglissa 
  Order Cercomonadida 
   Family Cavernomonadidae 
   Family Cercomonadidae 
  Order Glissomonadida 
   Suborder Allapsina 
    Family Allapsidae 
   Suborder Sandonina 
    Family Bodomorphidae 
    Family Sandonidae 
    Family Proleptomonadidae 
   Suborder Pansomonadina 
    Family Viridiraptoridae 
    Family Agitatidae 
    Family Acinetactidae 
    Family Aurigamonadidae 
 Sarcomonadea incertae sedis
  Family Katabiidae

References

 
Cercozoa classes